Bachar is a surname. Notable people with the surname include:

 Carmit Bachar (born 1974), member of The Pussycat Dolls
 Dian Bachar (born 1970), American actor
 John Bachar (1957–2009), American rock climber 
 Mohamed Bachar, Nigerien football player
 Oshrat Bachar (born 1979), Lieutenant colonel in the Israel Defense Forces
 Shai Bachar (born 1969), Israeli Olympic competitive sailor
 Yossi Bachar (born 1967), Israeli Major general who commands the IDF's General Staff Corps

See also
 Bachar ladder, a form of rope ladder used as a training device by rock climbers
 
 Bakhar (disambiguation)

Jewish surnames